Bert Cooke was a British football manager.

Bert Cooke may also refer to:

Bert Cooke (rugby)

See also
Bert Cook (disambiguation)
Herbert Cooke (disambiguation)
Robert Cooke (disambiguation)